Oi paranomoi is a 1958 Greek drama film directed by Nikos Koundouros. It was entered into the 8th Berlin International Film Festival.

Cast
 Titos Vandis - Kosmas
 Petros Fyssoun - Petros Kazakos
 Anestis Vlahos - Argyris
 Nelly Angelidou - Maria
 Giorgos Oikonomou - Bouras

References

External links

1958 films
1950s Greek-language films
1958 drama films
Greek black-and-white films
Films directed by Nikos Koundouros
Greek drama films